Roger Dale Stafford (November 4, 1951 – July 1, 1995) was a convicted serial killer executed for the 1978 murders of the Lorenz Family and six employees of a Sirloin Stockade restaurant in Oklahoma. Stafford never acknowledged his guilt, but Stafford's wife, Verna, implicated him in a total of 34 murders in seven different states.

Crimes
Stafford began his killing spree on January 12, 1974 by killing 20-year-old Jimmy Earl Berry, a student at the University of North Alabama, working as an assistant manager at a McDonald's restaurant in Muscle Shoals, Alabama. Berry was shot four times and the perpetrator robbed the restaurant of US$1,390.00. This crime remained unsolved until four years after the incident, when Stafford and his brother Harold were implicated by Dale's wife, Verna. Stafford was never prosecuted for Berry's murder because of the Oklahoma murder convictions.

He continued on with his murder spree along with his wife, Verna, and brother, Harold, on June 22, 1978. His wife flagged down the Lorenz family on the side of Interstate 35 near Purcell, Oklahoma, when Melvin Lorenz, 38, his wife, Linda, 31, and their son Richard, 12, were traveling to North Dakota for the funeral of Melvin Lorenz's mother. After the Lorenz family stopped to help, Stafford then robbed and murdered the entire family.

Three weeks later, he murdered six employees at a Sirloin Stockade restaurant in Oklahoma City during a robbery.

Capture and trial
Six days after the Sirloin Stockade robbery, Harold Stafford died in a motorcycle accident in Tulsa, Oklahoma. Police traced a woman who went to see his body at a local funeral home to Chicago, Illinois, where they found and arrested Verna Stafford. They soon apprehended Roger Stafford as well. 

On Oct. 17, 1979, he was convicted of all nine murders, and sentenced to death. His wife Verna testified against him, and divorced him while he was on death row (she was sentenced to two life terms for her part in the crimes). Stafford married again—twice—while awaiting execution.

Execution
Stafford was executed in Oklahoma by lethal injection on July 1, 1995. In his final moments, Stafford reportedly spoke in tongues to his third wife.

Less than two weeks later, Assistant Attorney General Sandy Howard received a $5 Sirloin Stockade gift certificate with the message "Hey, you got away with it. I am murder [sic] and you help [sic] do it! I am innocent and you know it" written on the back and signed "Roger Dale Stafford 103767". Investigators traced the certificate's origin to a Sirloin Stockade restaurant in El Reno, Oklahoma, and determined that it had been mailed from McAlester, Oklahoma (where Stafford was imprisoned) on July 3, two days after Stafford's execution.

See also
 Patrick Sherrill – Murdered 14 people in an Edmond, Oklahoma post office before committing suicide.
 Timothy McVeigh – Bombed the Alfred P. Murrah Federal Building in Oklahoma City, killing 168 people. Apprehended and executed.

General:
 List of people executed in Oklahoma
 List of serial killers by number of victims
 List of serial killers in the United States
 List of white defendants executed for killing a black victim
 Race and capital punishment in the United States

References

External links
 Roger Dale Stafford at Find A Grave

1951 births
1974 murders in the United States
1978 murders in the United States
1995 deaths
20th-century executions by Oklahoma
20th-century executions of American people
American mass murderers
American murderers of children
American people convicted of murder
American spree killers
Executed American serial killers
Executed mass murderers
Executed spree killers
Male serial killers
People convicted of murder by Oklahoma
People executed by Oklahoma by lethal injection
People executed for murder